Ghana has a large system of 21 protected areas which include 7 national parks, 6 Resource Reserves, 2 Wildlife Sanctuaries, 1 Strict Nature Reserve and 5 coastal wetlands.

National parks
Bia National Park
Bui National Park
Digya National Park - A park on the western bank of the Volta Lake that includes large swathes of inland estuary.  It is located approximately 100 km to the east of Techiman.
Kakum National Park - A coastal rainforest in the central region with abundant plant and animal life.  Park facilities include access to the upper rainforest canopy.  Located 30 km north of Cape Coast.
Kyabobo National Park
Mole National Park - A former game reserve in the isolated northern region of Ghana that contains an abundant variety of wildlife. It is located 100 km to the west of Tamale.
Nini Suhien National Park - A small forest located in the western region near the border of Cote d'Ivoire.

Conservation sites
Ankasa Conservation Area
Assin-Attandanso Game Production Reserve
Asubima Forest Reserve
Ayum Forest Reserve
Boin Tano Forest Reserve
Bonsam Bepo Forest Reserve
Draw River Forest Reserve
Gbele Game Production Reserve
Krokosua Hills Forest Reserve
Mamiri Forest Reserve
Tano Nimiri Forest Reserve
Kalakpa Game Production Reserve

See also 
 List of Ramsar sites in Ghana

References

National parks
Ghana

National parks